Balázs Hárai (born 5 April 1987) is a Hungarian water polo center forward. He competed at the 2012 and 2016 Olympics and won a gold medal at the 2013 World Championships.

Club career

Clubs
  BVSC-Brendon ( – )
  KSI SE ( –2006)
  Domino-Honvéd (2004–2008)
  ZF-Eger (2008–2010)
  Grupama Honvéd (2010–2012) 2x
  TEVA-Vasas (2012–2013)
  ZF-Eger (2013–2018) 2x
  Orvosegyetem (2018–)

Honours

National
 Olympic Games:  Bronze medal - 2020
 World Championships:  Gold medal - 2013;  Silver medal - 2017
 European Championship:  Gold medal - 2020;  Silver medal - 2014;  Bronze medal - 2012, 2016
 FINA World League:  Silver medal - 2013, 2014
 FINA World Cup:  Silver medal - 2014
 Junior World Championships: (gold medal - 2007)

Club
 Hungarian Championship (OB I): 2x (2005, 2006 - with Bp. Honvéd)
 Hungarian Cup (Magyar Kupa): 4x (2006, 2010 - with Bp. Honvéd; 2008, 2009 - with Eger)

Awards
 Szalay Iván Award (2005)
 Junior Príma Award (2011)
   Silver Cross of the Cross of Merit of Hungary (2012)
 Hungarian Water Polo Player of the Year: 2015, 2016

See also
 List of world champions in men's water polo
 List of World Aquatics Championships medalists in water polo

References

External links

 

Hungarian male water polo players
1987 births
Living people
Water polo players at the 2012 Summer Olympics
Water polo players at the 2016 Summer Olympics
World Aquatics Championships medalists in water polo
People from Halásztelek
Water polo players at the 2020 Summer Olympics
Medalists at the 2020 Summer Olympics
Olympic bronze medalists for Hungary in water polo
Sportspeople from Budapest
21st-century Hungarian people